Johan Eberhard Geijer (19 October 1733 – 21 December 1796) was a Swedish ironmaster.

Born in Uddeholm in Värmland, Sweden on October 19, 1733, to Bengt Gustaf Geijer and Lovisa Sophia Tranæa, Geijer married Anna Fredrika Löfman and had children. He served as "huvudmasmästare" in Värmland from 1760 to 1763 and owned the Bofors Works from 1762 to 1770 when his brother, Emanuel af Geijerstam, acquired it. Geijer later acquired the Lindfors Works.

References

Works cited 

 

1733 births
1796 deaths
Swedish landowners
Swedish ironmasters
Johan Eberhard
Swedish people of Austrian descent
18th-century Swedish businesspeople
People from Hagfors Municipality
Bofors people